Voyvozh (Vojvož) is an urban locality (an urban-type settlement) under the administrative jurisdiction of the town of republic significance of Sosnogorsk in the Komi Republic, Russia. As of the 2010 Census, its population was 3,387.

Administrative and municipal status
Within the framework of administrative divisions, the urban-type settlement of Voyvozh, together with two rural localities, is incorporated as Voyvozh Urban-Type Settlement Administrative Territory, which is subordinated to the town of republic significance of Sosnogorsk. As a municipal division, Voyvozh Urban-Type Settlement Administrative Territory is incorporated within Sosnogorsk Municipal District as Voyvozh Urban Settlement.

References

Notes

Sources

Urban-type settlements in the Komi Republic
